Jens Lorenz Franzen (27 April 1937 – 21 November 2018) was a German paleontologist. He was the head of Paleoanthropology and Quaternary at Naturmuseum Senckenberg in Frankfurt and participated in fossil excavation in Germany. He worked with scientific excavations and discovered many previously unknown fossil mammal species.

Career
Franzen was born in Bremen in 1937.

From 1968 to 1969 Franzen was a research assistant at the Geological-Paleontological Institute of the Albert-Ludwigs-University Freiburg and was a research assistant from 1969 to 1970. From 1973 to 1984, Franzen protested with other members of the scientific community against a landfill near the Messel pit in Darmstadt.

In 1987, Franzen worked as a scientific advisor in Messel. From 1977 to 2000, he was curator and head of paleoanthropology at the Senckenberg research institute in Frankfurt am Main from 1982 to 1999 and led the head of the quaternary paleontology department in 2000. He was the First Chairman of the Science Committee of the Senckenberg Research Institute from 1992 to 2000 and was a member of the Board of Directors of the Senckenberg Natural Science Society. He retired September 2000 and volunteered at the Senckenberg Research Institute as well as the Geosciences Department of the Natural History Museum in Basel.

In 1998 he won the Friedrich von Alberti Prize for his studies in human history as well as his research and conservation of the UNESCO World Heritage Site of the Messel pit. In 2009 he was one of the authors of the first description of the fossil primate Darwinius.

Studies
Franzen dealt with paleogenic equidae, the primates from Messel, as well as the Eocene mammals from Eckfeld during the late Miocene. He studied the mammalian chronology of the European Eocene and Upper Miocene.

Franzen participated in the excavation at a fossil site near Darmstadt in Hesse. Franzen also carried out paleontological and paleoanthropological studies in Morocco (1971), Libya (1972), Greece (1963, 1975) and Mexico (1991–1992).

Franzen was a member of numerous societies including the Society of Vertebrate Paleontology, Paleontological Society, Upper Rhine Geological Association, Natural Research Society Freiburg, Archaeological Society of Hesse, Messel Museum Association and the Dinotherium-Museum Eppelsheim Association.

Death
Franzen died on 21 November 2018 in Freiburg im Breisgau.

Honors
Several fossil species have been named in honor of Franzen. In the field of the genera and subgenera Franzenium ng ( Casanovas-Cladellas & Santafé-Llopis, 1989) and Franzenitherium n.subg. ( Remy, JA, 1992). In addition, the newly discovered species Palaeotherium franzeni n.sp. ( Casanovas-Cladellas, 1980), Masillabune franzeni n.sp. Erfurt & Haubold, 1989, Neochelys franzeni n.sp. ( Schleich, 1993) and Tachypteron franzeni n.sp. ( Stork, Sigé & Habersetzer, 2002)

Publications
"New mammal finds from the Eocene of Eckfelder Maares near Manderscheid (Eifel)". In: Mainz Natural Science. Arch. Supplement 16, Mainz 1994, pp. 189–211.
"The Equoidea of the European Central Eocene". In: Hallesches Jb. Geowiss. Volume 17, Halle 1995, pp. 31–45.
"A coprolite as a treat. The seventh primate find from Messel". In: Natur u. Museum. Volume 127, No. 2, Frankfurt am Main 1997, pp. 46–53.
"The sixth Messel Primate (Mammalia, Primates, Notharctidae, Cercamoniinae)". In: Senckenbergiana lethaea. Volume 80, Frankfurt am Main 2000, pp. 289–303.
"First fossil primates from the Eckfeld Maar, Middle Eocene (Eifel, Germany)". In: Eclogae geologicae Helvetiae. Volume 97, Basel 2004, pp. 213–220.
The Dawn of Dawn. Origin and Evolution of Horses. Spectrum Academic Publishing House (Elsevier), Heidelberg 2007, .

Works

New genera
Pseudopalaeotherium Franzen, 1972
Messelobunodon Franzen, 1981
Hallensia Franzen & Haubold, 1986
Neufferia Franzen, 1994
Lutzia Franzen, 1994, pre-occupied by Lutzia Theobald, 1903, now valid Herbertlutzius Franzen, 2009
Godinotia Franzen, 2000
Eurohippus Franzen, 2006
Darwinius Franzen et al., 2009

New species
Palaeotherium pomeli Franzen, 1968
Pseudopalaeotherium longirostratum Franzen, 1972
Messelobunodon schaeferi Franzen, 1981
Messelobunodon ceciliensis Franzen & Krumbiegel, 1980
Europolemur koenigswaldi Franzen, 1987
Hallensia matthesi Franzen & Haubold 1986
Hallensia parisiensis Franzen, 1990
Neufferia manderscheidi Franzen, 1994
Lutzia eckfeldensis Franzen, 1994
Lophiotherium sondaari Franzen, 1999
Europolemur kelleri Franzen, 2000
Plesiosorex roosi Franzen, Fejfar & Storch, 2003

New subspecies
Palaeotherium castrense robiacense Franzen, 1968
Palaeotherium crassum robustum Franzen, 1968
Palaeotherium muehlbergi praecursum Franzen, 1968
Palaeotherium curtum villerealense Franzen, 1968
Palaeotherium curtum frohnstettense Franzen, 1968
Palaeotherium duvali priscum Franzen, 1968

References

1937 births
German paleontologists
German naturalists
20th-century German zoologists
2018 deaths